Olivais may refer to:

Olivais (Lisbon), a parish of Lisbon, Portugal
 Olivais (Lisbon Metro), a station on the Lisbon Metro
Santo António dos Olivais, Coimbra, Portugal
 Olivais e Moscavide, a Portuguese football club

See also 
 Olivas